KURU (89.1 MHz) is an FM radio station licensed to serve the community of Silver City, New Mexico. The station is owned by Gila / Mimbres Community Radio. It airs a variety radio format.

The station was assigned the KURU call letters by the Federal Communications Commission on April 10, 2011.

References

External links
 Official Website
 

URU (FM)
Radio stations established in 2014
2014 establishments in New Mexico
Variety radio stations in the United States
Grant County, New Mexico